Aegean Sea earthquake may refer to:
 1968 Aegean Sea earthquake
 2014 Aegean Sea earthquake
 2017 Aegean Sea earthquake
 2020 Aegean Sea earthquake
Earthquakes in the Aegean Sea:

 262 Southwest Anatolia earthquake
 1688 Smyrna earthquake
 1881 Chios earthquake
 1904 Samos earthquake
 1932 Ierissos earthquake
 1956 Amorgos earthquake
 2006 Greece earthquake
 2017 Lesbos earthquake